The Okhla Bird Sanctuary metro station is located on the Magenta Line of the Delhi Metro. It is located near the Okhla Bird Sanctuary, one of the 466 IBAs (Important Bird Areas) of India.

Station

Location
The Okhla Bird Sanctuary metro station is situated outside Delhi in Noida on the Magenta Line of Delhi Metro.

Station layout

Facilities

The station has the following facilities: 
Toilet: On the unpaid concourse 
Food / Restaurant: Grub Hub on the ground floor (facing the Supernova Spira)

Connections

Bus
DTC bus routes number 8, 8A, 34, 34A, 443 and 493 serve the station.

Entry/Exit

See also

Delhi
List of Delhi Metro stations
Transport in Delhi
Delhi Metro Rail Corporation
Delhi Suburban Railway
Delhi Monorail
Delhi Transport Corporation
Uttar Pradesh
Noida
Okhla Sanctuary
Okhla barrage
National Capital Region (India)
List of rapid transit systems
List of metro systems

References

External links

 Delhi Metro Rail Corporation Ltd. (Official site)
 Delhi Metro Annual Reports
 
 UrbanRail.Net – descriptions of all metro systems in the world, each with a schematic map showing all stations.

Delhi Metro stations
Railway stations in India opened in 2017
Railway stations in Gautam Buddh Nagar district